Muḥammad ibn Tamīm ibn Tamām al-Tamīmī (died 945) more commonly known as Abu al-Arab was a 10th-century Arab Muslim historian, poet, traditionist and faqih of the Maliki school. His most celebrated work is Tabaqat 'Ulama Ifriqiya which include numerous scholars of his time.

Biography 
Abu al-Arab year of birth is unknown, though he most probably was born between 864 and 873 in the city of Kayrawan, the cultural center of Ifriqiya (corresponds to modern-day Tunisia), at the time was under the control of the Fatimid Caliphate. He belonged to a noble Arab family of governors. His great-grandfather held the governorship of Tunis and he also successfully managed to seize control of Kayrawan in the year 799. Abu al-Arab studied under a number of scholars who were themselves took knowledge from the renowned Kayrawani jurist Sahnun (d. 854/55), and he wrote a detailed account of Sahnun's life. Sequentially, Abu al-Arab devoted his time to teaching in Kayrawan, his most notable student was Ibn Abi Zayd al-Kayrawani (d. 996). Abu al-Arab participated in Abu Yazid's revolt against the Fatimids, eventually he was imprisoned. Few years later, he died in 945.

Works 
According to al-Zirkili, Abu al-Arab works consist of 3,000 books which are mostly lost.

 Tabaqat 'Ulama Ifriqiya (Classes of Scholars of Ifriqiya)
 'Ibad Ifriqiya (People of Ifriqiya)
 Kitab al-Tarikh (Book of History) in seventeen volumes.
 Manaqib Bani Tamim (Merits of Bani Tamim)
 Al-Mihan (Adversities)
 Fada'il Malik (Merits of Malik)
 Manaqib Sahnun (Merits of Sahnun)
 Mawt al-'Ulama (Death of Scholars) in two volumes.

See also 

 List of pre-modern Arab scientists and scholars

References 

9th-century births
945 deaths
Year of birth uncertain
9th-century Arabs
9th-century Arabic poets
10th-century Arabic poets
10th-century historians from the Fatimid Caliphate
Hadith scholars
10th-century Arabs
Maliki fiqh scholars
People from Kairouan